Hasanabad-e Yek may refer to:
 Hasanabad-e Yek, Anbarabad
 Hasanabad-e Yek, Sirjan
 Hasanabad-e Yek, Saadatabad, Sirjan County